Theodore Weld Burdick (October 7, 1836 – July 16, 1898) was a one-term Republican U.S. Representative from Iowa's 3rd congressional district.

Born in Evansburg, Pennsylvania, Burdick attended the common schools.
He moved with his parents to Decorah, Iowa, in 1853 and at age seventeen became the community's first schoolteacher.  
He was a deputy treasurer and recorder of Winneshiek County from 1854 to 1857, and the treasurer and recorder from 1858 to 1862, when he resigned to recruit a company for the Union Army in the Civil War.  He was commissioned as captain and assigned to Company D the 6th Regiment Iowa Volunteer Cavalry. He served for three years in the Department of the Northwest, in response to uprisings in southern Minnesota and Dakota Territory by Native Americans against settlers.  After the regiment was mustered out in 1865 he returned to Decorah and became cashier of the First National Bank.

In 1876, Burdick was elected as a Republican to the Forty-fifth Congress, where he served from March 4, 1877 to March 3, 1879. He served on the House Committee on Expenditures.  In 1878, he declined to be a candidate for renomination.
He resumed banking at Decorah, and Sault Ste. Marie, Michigan.
He served as member of the Iowa Senate in 1886 and 1887.

He died in Decorah from July 16, 1898. He was interred in Phelps Cemetery.

References

1836 births
1898 deaths
United States Army officers
Republican Party members of the United States House of Representatives from Iowa
Republican Party Iowa state senators
19th-century American politicians